The 2018–19 California Golden Bears women's basketball team represented University of California, Berkeley during the 2018–19 NCAA Division I women's basketball season. The Golden Bears, led by eighth year head coach Lindsay Gottlieb, played their home games at the Haas Pavilion as members of the Pac-12 Conference. They finished the season 20–13, 9–9 in Pac-12 play to finish in a tie for sixth place. They advanced to the quarterfinals of the Pac-12 women's tournament where they lost to Stanford. They received an at-large bid to the NCAA women's tournament where they defeated North Carolina in the first round before losing to Baylor in the second round.

Roster

Schedule

|-
!colspan=9 style=|Exhibition

|-
!colspan=9 style=|Non-conference regular season

|-
!colspan=9 style=| Pac-12 regular season

|-
!colspan=9 style=| Pac-12 Women's Tournament

|-
!colspan=9 style=| NCAA Women's Tournament

Rankings

^Coaches did not release a Week 2 poll.

See also
 2018–19 California Golden Bears men's basketball team

References

California Golden Bears women's basketball seasons
California
Golden Bear
Golden Bear
California